The 2019 NEAFL season was the final season of the North East Australian Football League (NEAFL). The season began on 6 April and concluded on 15 September 2019. The Grand Final was won by the Brisbane Lions reserves, who defeated Southport by 76 points.

Ladder

Finals

Elimination Finals

Preliminary Finals

Grand Final

See also 
 List of NEAFL premiers
 Australian rules football
 North East Australian Football League
 Australian Football League
 2019 AFL season

References

External links
 Season results

Australian rules football competition seasons
NEAFL